The 1904 British Isles tour to New Zealand and Australia was the sixth tour by a British Isles rugby union team and the third to New Zealand or Australia. It is retrospectively classed as one of the British Lions tours, as the Lions naming convention was not adopted until 1950.

Led by Scotland captain David Bedell-Sivright and managed by Arthur O'Brien the tour included 19 matches, 14 in Australia and 5 in New Zealand. Four of the fixtures were test matchesthree against Australia and one against the New Zealand All Blacks. The Lions won all three Australian tests but lost the All Blacks' game.

This was the first time that a British team played both Australia and New Zealand in the same tour. It was also the last series until 1989 in which Australian matches were the major component; in between the only Australian fixtures were those appended onto a longer New Zealand tour. The team's captain, Bedell-Sivright, a veteran of the 1903 tour of South Africa, was requested to lead the team by England's Rugby Football Union. Bedell-Sivright broke his leg in the opening match of the New Zealand leg of the tour and Teddy Morgan took over the captaincy.

The uniforms wore by the Lions remained the same than previous tours, blue used in thick hoops and the red and white in thin bands.

Touring party
Manager: Arthur O'Brien

Full-backs
 Christopher Stanger-Leathes (Northern)

Three-quarters
 John Fisher (Hull and East Ridings)
Rhys Gabe (Cardiff)
Fred Jowett (Swansea)
Willie Llewellyn (Newport)
Teddy Morgan (London Welsh)
Pat McEvedy (Guy's Hospital)
Arthur O'Brien (Guy's Hospital)

Half-backs
Percy Bush (Cardiff)
Tommy Vile (Newport)
Frank Croft Hulme (Birkenhead Park)

Forwards
David Bedell-Sivright (Cambridge University and ) (captain)
Sid Bevan (Swansea)
Sidney Nelson Crowther (Lennox FC)
John Sharland (Streatham)
Denys Dobson (Oxford University)
Charlie Patterson (Malone RFC)
Reg Edwards (Malone RFC)
Arthur Harding (Cardiff)
Burnett Massey (Hull and East Ridings)
Ron Rogers (Bath)
Stuart Saunders (Guy's Hospital)
D.H. Traill (Guy's Hospital)
Blair Swannell (Northampton)

Results
Complete list of matches played by the British Lions:

 Test matches

Test details

Australia 1st Test

Australia 2nd Test

Australia 3rd Test

New Zealand

Notes

References

Further reading

External links 

 1904 | Australia & New Zealand tour on British Lions website (archived, 6 June 2014)
 

1904
1904
1903–04 in British rugby union
1904 in Irish sport
1904 in Australian rugby union
1904 in New Zealand rugby union
1904 rugby union tours